The New York State Conference was an intercollegiate athletic conference that existed from 1926 to 1934. The league had members in Upstate New York.

Members

Football champions

1926 – Niagara
1927 – Niagara
1928 – Niagara

1929 – Niagara
1930 – Niagara
1931 – St. Lawrence

1932 – Clarkson
1933 – Unknown
1934 – Clarkson

See also
List of defunct college football conferences

References